Her Body and Other Parties  is a 2017 short story collection by the writer Carmen Maria Machado, published by Graywolf Press. The collection won the Shirley Jackson Award, and was a finalist for the National Book Award for Fiction. The story "The Husband Stitch" was nominated for the Nebula Award for Best Novelette.

Content

Literary significance and reception 
Critical reviews for the short story collection were extremely positive. The review aggregator website Bookmarks notes that the collection received "rave" reviews.

Parul Sehgal of The New York Times wrote, "It's a wild thing, this book, covered in sequins and scales, blazing with the influence of fabulists from Angela Carter to Kelly Link and Helen Oyeyemi, and borrowing from science fiction, queer theory and horror."  A review in Slate said, "In eight searingly original stories, Machado uses the literary techniques of horror and science fiction to expose the truth about our modern parables: that they're as grotesque and enchanting as any classic fairy tale."

Novelist Kathleen Rooney, writing in The Chicago Tribune, wrote, "In her twistedly original and thrilling debut short story collection, Her Body and Other Parties, Carmen Maria Machado blends both the terrifying and the horrible into a psychologically realistic and darkly comic mixture."

An NPR review also compared her to Angela Carter, and concluded, "Machado seems to answer: The world makes madwomen, and the least you can do is make sure the attic is your own."

Writing for the Los Angeles Times, Ellie Robbins described Machado's collection as "that hallowed thing: an example of almost preposterous talent that also encapsulates something vital but previously diffuse about the moment." Robbins concluded her review by praising the author, "In 'Her Body and Other Parties,' Machado reveals just how original, subversive, proud and joyful it can be to write from deep in the gut, even — especially — if the gut has been bruised."

Stories

"The Husband Stitch" 
Winner of the 2014 Nebula novelette award, "The Husband Stitch" is the introducing short story in Her Body and Other Parties. Machado originally published this short story on October 28, 2014 in an online writing publishing website named Granta. "The Husband Stitch" was then published in Her Body and Other Parties in 2017.  

Drawing on old folklore and urban legends like "The Girl with the Green Ribbon" in its depiction by Alvin Schwartz, "The Husband Stitch" is narrated by a woman with a green ribbon around her neck. In the story, all women have a specific location and color to their ribbon. The narrator talks the reader through her sexual explorations, marriage, motherhood, and the extent in which the "good" men in her life lead to her demise. 

The short story begins at a party where the narrator meets her future husband and the father to her child. Upon meeting the boy at the party, the two fall madly in love, and they freely explore each other's sexual desires. However, the narrator has set boundaries in terms of what she allows from him. One of her two rules in their relationship is that he must never touch or untie her ribbon. Despite her objections, her husband becomes obsessed with trying to touch and loosen the ribbon and tries at any chance he can get. This problem only gets worse for her when she gives birth to their son, as he also becomes increasingly curious of her ribbon.  

Hoping to raise her son to become a better man, the narrator retells passed down urban legends told in the female perspective to him. With time, the stories become less frequently told, and her son becomes less and less interested. Similarly, it becomes increasingly harder for the narrator to keep her husband from touching her ribbon. Eventually, the narrator allows her ribbon to be untied, and the consequences that follow are life changing.

Themes 
Critic Mary Hood explains that in "The Husband Stitch", "female desire is an important theme" However, Hood offers that while "female desire is present, it is always secondary to male desire." So, the self-sacrifice women must make in a male dominated world is revealed in this story. Shana E. Hadi in The Stanford Daily notes the significance of the title "The Husband Stitch," "which references a post-birth medical procedure to tighten the vagina and give the man additional pleasure during intercourse, despite the woman's pain." Likewise, the narrator goes through this procedure after giving birth to her son. This may hint at the idea that she gives everything she can to her husband not even including his eventual access to her ribbon.

"Especially Heinous" 
In an interview with The Paris Review, Machado talked about her inspiration for the novella Especially Heinous where she re-imagined episodes of Law & Order: SVU: "My initial idea was to rewrite the existing episode descriptions in slightly surreal versions. So I looked up the little capsule descriptions of the episodes, and I was trying to manipulate them to make them surreal, but it was too restrictive. Then I realized that all the titles are one-word titles. And what if I just use the titles? I put only the titles all in a row, and then just started writing and imagining Benson and Stabler."

References 

Short story collections by Carmen Maria Machado
2017 short story collections
Graywolf Press books
LGBT-related horror literature
2010s LGBT literature